Propodilobus is a genus of ants in the subfamily Myrmicinae. It contains the single species Propodilobus pingorum, known only from two localities on Borneo, Sarawak, Malaysia.

References

Myrmicinae
Monotypic ant genera
Hymenoptera of Asia